Nanjikottai Vengarayan kudi kaddu is a village in the Thanjavur taluk of Thanjavur district, Tamil Nadu, India.

Demographics 

As per the 2001 census, Nanjikottai Vengarayan kudi kaddu had a total population of 2299 with 1156 males and 1143 females. The sex ratio was 989. The literacy rate was 69.67.

References 

Villages in Thanjavur district